Benzil reductase may refer to:
 Benzil reductase ((R)-benzoin forming)
 Benzil reductase ((S)-benzoin forming)